Seehund, Puma & Co. is a German television series.

See also
List of German television series

External links
 

Radio Bremen
2007 German television series debuts
2010s German television series
Television series about mammals
German-language television shows
Das Erste original programming